Albert Berbatovci (born 17 February 1989) is a Norwegian professional footballer who plays for Byåsen.

Born in SFR Yugoslavia, Berbatovci is of Kosovar Albanian heritage. He began his career in 2007 with Rosenborg, and has spent loan spells at Stavanger, Ranheim and Tiller. In 2012, he joined Nardo. In 2018 he went on to then-fourth-tier Byåsen.

References

1989 births
Living people
Kosovan emigrants to Norway
Norwegian footballers
Rosenborg BK players
Stavanger IF players
Ranheim Fotball players
Association football midfielders
Byåsen Toppfotball players
Eliteserien players
Norwegian First Division players
Norway youth international footballers